The Teiș oil field is an oil field located in Șotânga, Dâmbovița County. It was discovered in 1974 and developed by Petrom. It began production in 1975 and produces oil and natural gas.

References

Oil fields in Romania